Fergus "Gus" Greensmith (born 26 December 1996) is a British rally driver.

Rally career 
Greensmith's family owns fuel and lubricants distributor Crown Oil. A former youth goalkeeper for Manchester City F.C. and karter before moving into the ranks of rally driving.

As a karter who went to school in Manchester he appeared in the CIK-FIA U18 World Karting Championship in 2012, racing alongside Charles Leclerc, Ben Barnicoat and Joey Mawson among others.

In 2014, Greensmith won the British Junior Rally Championship on a Ford Fiesta R1, and debuted at the Wales Rally GB on a Ford Fiesta R2.

In 2015, he entered the Drive DMACK Fiesta Trophy, where he finished sixth. He also entered five WRC rounds on a Ford Fiesta R2T.

At the 2016 Wales Rally GB, Greensmith drove a M-Sport Ford Fiesta R5.

He competed full-time in the 2017 World Rally Championship-2 on an M-Sport Ford Fiesta R5, finishing 11th in the overall standings.

In the 2018 World Rally Championship-2 he scored four podiums and placed fourth in points. In the 2018 Rally Mexico, Greensmith finished ninth and scored World Rally Championship points for the first time.

In 2019 he claimed two wins and six podiums on a Ford Fiesta R5, ranking third in the WRC-2 standings. He also entered three rounds with an M-Sport Ford Fiesta WRC, finishing 9th in Germany.

The Brit became an M-Sport Ford factory driver for the 2020 World Rally Championship. He had a best finish of fifth at Turkey, and finished 11th in points.

In 2021 he had a best result of fourth at the Safari Rally, and was 9th in the overall table.

Greensmith earned his first WRC stage victory at the 2022 Monte Carlo Rally. He scored points in five out of 13 races, and was 10th in the WRC drivers standings.

Media
In 2015, he teamed up with Idris Elba in a documentary series that Elba was filming for Discovery TV and drove him in a Ford Fiesta.

Career results

WRC results

Drive DMACK Cup results

WRC-2 results

WRC-2 Pro results

References

External links

Gus Greensmith official website
eWRC results

British rally drivers
English rally drivers
1996 births
World Rally Championship drivers
Living people
English racing drivers
Sportspeople from Manchester
Karting World Championship drivers
M-Sport drivers